Foster Plateau is a plateau, about  in area, lying between Drygalski Glacier and Hektoria Glacier in northern Graham Land, Antarctica. It borders Forbidden Plateau on the south and Herbert Plateau on the north. The feature was photographed by the Falkland Islands and Dependencies Aerial Survey Expedition in 1956–57 and mapped from these photos by the Falkland Islands Dependencies Survey (FIDS). It was named by the UK Antarctic Place-Names Committee in 1960 for Richard A. Foster, FIDS leader of the Danco Island station in 1956 and 1957.

Central plateaus of Graham Land
North to south:
 Laclavère Plateau
 Louis Philippe Plateau
 Detroit Plateau
 Herbert Plateau
 Foster Plateau
 Forbidden Plateau
 Bruce Plateau
 Avery Plateau
 Hemimont Plateau

Further reading 
 Damien Gildea, Antarctic Peninsula - Mountaineering in Antarctica: Travel Guide

References 

Plateaus of Antarctica
Landforms of Graham Land
Danco Coast